Alexander Vencel (born 8 February 1944) is a Slovak former professional football goalkeeper. He played 25 matches for Czechoslovakia.

He was a participant in the 1970 FIFA World Cup, and in the 1976 UEFA European Championship, where Czechoslovakia won the gold medal.

He played mostly for Slovan Bratislava.

His son, Alexander Vencel Jr., also a goalkeeper, won a number of caps for Slovakia in the mid-1990s.

Career statistics

International
Source:

References

1944 births
Slovak footballers
Czechoslovak footballers
1970 FIFA World Cup players
UEFA Euro 1976 players
UEFA European Championship-winning players
Association football goalkeepers
Living people
Czechoslovakia international footballers
ŠK Slovan Bratislava players
FC Nitra players
People from Bistrița-Năsăud County